To Win or To Lose is the second studio album by The Pine Hill Haints.

Track listing

Side A
"Intro" (Jamie) – 
"Not So Lucky and the Invisible Kid" (Jamie) – 
"Charley Horse" (Jamie) – 
"Bordello Blackwidow" (Matt) - 
"Scar" (Jamie) - 
"Halloween-Time All the Time" (Jamie) - 
"Never Cry" (Jamie) -
"Revenge of the SpiderWeb Boy" (Jamie) - 
"Je Passe Devant ta Porte" (Traditional) -

Side B
"Never Gonna Die" (Matt) -
"My Bones are Gonna Rise Again" (Matt) - 
"How Much Poison Does It Take" (Jamie) - 
"The Rangers Command" (Traditional) -
"Screaming Jenny" (Matt) -
"Doublehead" (Jamie) - 
"You Are My Thief" (Jamie) -

Personnel
The Pine Hill Haints are
Jamie Barrier - Guitar, Fiddle
Matt Bakula - Bucket, Banjo
Ben Rhyne - Snare
Katie Kat - Washboard. Mandolin, Saw
Mike Posey - accordion
Joey Barrier - Banjo

References
Track Listing at Amazon.com

2004 albums
The Pine Hill Haints albums
K Records albums